Malaysia competed in the 1982 Commonwealth Games held in Brisbane, Queensland, Australia from 30 September to 9 October 1982.

Medal summary

Medals by sport

Medallists

Badminton

References

Malaysia at the Commonwealth Games
Nations at the 1982 Commonwealth Games
1982 in Malaysian sport